Yamauchi Dam is an earthfill dam located in Chiba Prefecture in Japan. The dam is used for irrigation. The catchment area of the dam is 0.6 km2. The dam impounds about 90  ha of land when full and can store 360 thousand cubic meters of water. The construction of the dam was started on 1997 and completed in 2004.

References

Dams in Chiba Prefecture
2004 establishments in Japan